Andrew Ellis Farmer (born December 14, 1979) is an American politician and a Republican member of the Tennessee House of Representatives representing District 17 since January 8, 2013.

Education
Farmer earned his bachelor's degree in business administration from East Tennessee State University and his JD from Thomas M. Cooley Law School.

Elections
2012 Farmer challenged District 17 incumbent Representative Frank S. Niceley in the three-way August 2, 2012 Republican Primary, winning with 2,980 votes (52.1%), and won the November 6, 2012 General election with 14,244 votes (76.1%) against Democratic nominee Mike Dockery, who had run for the seat in 2010.

References

External links
Official page at the Tennessee General Assembly
Campaign site

Andrew Farmer at Ballotpedia
Andrew E. Farmer at OpenSecrets

Place of birth missing (living people)
1979 births
Living people
East Tennessee State University alumni
Republican Party members of the Tennessee House of Representatives
People from Sevierville, Tennessee
Tennessee lawyers
Western Michigan University Cooley Law School alumni
21st-century American politicians